= Mochadion =

Coastal town of ancient Bithynia

Coordinates: 41°11′54″N 29°07′12″E

Mochadion was a coastal town of ancient Bithynia located on the Bosphorus.

Its site is tentatively located near Fil Burnu in Asiatic Turkey.
